Pristimantis jaimei is a species of frog in the family Strabomantidae.
It is endemic to Colombia.
Its natural habitats are tropical moist lowland forests and moist montane forests.
It is threatened by habitat loss.

References

jaimei
Amphibians of Colombia
Endemic fauna of Colombia
Amphibians described in 1992
Taxonomy articles created by Polbot